The Barlas were a Turko-Mongol nomadic confederation in Central Asia.

Barlas may also refer to:

 Barlas (given name), a Turkish given name.
 Barlas (surname), a surname
 Barlas Erinç (21st century), Turkish musician

Turkish masculine given names